The Men's under-23 time trial of the 2022 UCI Road World Championships was a cycling event that took place on 19 September 2022 in Wollongong, Australia. It was the 26th edition of the championship. The race was won by Norwegian rider Søren Wærenskjold, finishing sixteen seconds ahead of Alec Segaert of Belgium.

Final classification

References

Men's under-23 time trial
UCI Road World Championships – Men's under-23 time trial
2022 in men's road cycling